Søren Peter Kristensen (20 August 1887 – 29 June 1944) was a member of the Danish resistance executed by the German occupying power.

Biography 

Kristensen was born in Riis Mark, Ousted on 20 August 1887 as son of farmer Johannes Kristensen and 43-year-old wife Karen Marie née Nielsen and baptized in Ousted church on the 20th Sunday after Trinity the same year.

In addition to being a member of the Hvidsten group Kristensen was also a coach builder.

The group helped the British Special Operations Executive parachute weapons and supplies into Denmark for distribution to the resistance.

In March 1944 the Gestapo made an "incredible number of arrests" including in the region of Randers where a number of members of the Hvidsten group were arrested.

The following month De frie Danske reported that several arrestees from Hvidsten had been transferred from Randers to Vestre Fængsel.

On 29 June 1944 Kristensen and seven other members of the Hvidsten group were executed in Ryvangen.

After his death 

On 15 July 1944 De frie Danske reported on the execution of several members of the Hvidsten group. Six months later the January 1945 issue of the resistance newspaper Frit Danmark (Free Denmark) reported that on 29 June the previous year Kristensen and seven other named members of the Hvidsten group had been executed.

On 5 July 1945 Kristensen's remains and those of five others from the group were found in Ryvangen and transferred to the Department of Forensic Medicine of the university of Copenhagen where an inquest the same day showed that he was executed with gunshot wounds to the chest. The remains of the two remaining executed members of the group, Marius Fiil and his son Niels had been found in the same area three days before.

On 10 July he was together with the seven other executed group members cremated at Bispebjerg Cemetery.

In 1945 a memorial stone over the eight executed members of the Hvidsten group was raised near Hvidsten Inn.

Similarly a larger memorial stone for resistance members including the eight executed members of the Hvidsten group has been laid down in Ryvangen Memorial Park.

Portrayal in the media
 In the 2012 Danish drama film Hvidsten Gruppen (This Life) Søren Peter Kristensen is portrayed by Arne Siemsen.

References 

 
 

1887 births
1944 deaths
Danish people executed by Nazi Germany
Danish people of World War II
Danish resistance members
Resistance members killed by Nazi Germany